William Plomer was a writer.

William Plomer may also refer to:

William Plomer (MP for Great Bedwyn), English politician
William Plomer (MP for Cricklade), see Cricklade (UK Parliament constituency)